Mickaël Hanany (born 25 March 1983, in Vitry-sur-Seine) is a French high jumper. His biggest success to date is winning the bronze medal at the 2012 European Championships in Helsinki.

He finished seventh at the 2002 World Junior Championships. He also competed at the 2002 European Indoor Championships, the 2005 World Championships and the 2006 European Championships without reaching the final round.

His personal best jump is 2.34 metres, achieved in 2014 in El Paso.

Competition record

References
 

1983 births
Living people
People from Vitry-sur-Seine
French male high jumpers
Olympic athletes of France
Athletes (track and field) at the 2008 Summer Olympics
Athletes (track and field) at the 2012 Summer Olympics
European Athletics Championships medalists
Athletes (track and field) at the 2018 Mediterranean Games
Sportspeople from Val-de-Marne
Mediterranean Games competitors for France
21st-century French people